Buenos Aires Rojo Sangre (BARS) is an international film festival devoted to the genres of science fiction, horror and fantasy. It began in 2000 with a focus on independent films in those genres, and since 2004 in the form of a competitive festival, Buenos Aires Rojo Sangre is well attended with over 200 films shown and 12.000 public and industry admissions each year. BARS is declared of national interest by the National Institute of Cinema and Audiovisual Arts, sponsored by the Film Museum of the City of Buenos Aires and declared of cultural interest by the legislature of the autonomous city of Buenos Aires.

Editions
Since edition nr5, the festival has given out awards to short and feature films.

BARS 2004
INTERNATIONAL FEATURE SECTION
 Best Feature Film: The Last Horror Movie (UK) by Julian Richards.
 Best Feature Director: Greg Pak for Robot Stories (USA).
 Best Feature Screenplay: Greg Pak for Robot Stories (USA).
 Best Actor in a Feature Film: Kevin Howarth for The Last Horror Movie.
 Best Actress in a Feature Film: Elena Siritto for Habitaciones para turistas (Argentina).
 Audience Award: Habitaciones para turistas (Argentina) by Adrián García Bogliano.
SHORT FILM SECTION
 Best Short Film: Redrat, la rata retobada by Guillermo Kloetzer (Uruguay)
 Best Short Film Director: Daniel Greaves for Little Things (UK)
 Audience Award for Best Short Film: Gorgonas by Salvador Sanz (Argentina)

BARS 2005
INTERNATIONAL FEATURE SECTION
 Best Feature Film: Beneath the Cogon (Philippines) by Rico Maria Ilarde.
 Best Feature Director: Jeniffer Kroot for Sirens of the 23rd Century (USA).
 Best Feature Screenplay: Bill Marks, Sean K Robb for Zombie King and the legion of Doom (Canada).
 Best Actor in a Feature Film: David Muyllaert for Dead Meat (Ireland).
 Best Actress in a Feature Film: Paula Guía for De noche van a tu cuarto (Argentina).
 Audience Award: De noche van a tu cuarto (Argentina) by Sebastián de Caro.
NATIONAL FEATURE SECTION
 Best Argentinian Feature Film: Grité una Noche by Adrián García Bogliano.
SHORT FILM SECTION
 Best Short Film: Retruc by Francesc Talavera (Spain)
 Best Short Film Director: John Dunstan, Michael Pazt for Battle Chess (UK)
 Audience Award for Best Short Film: Alex, Vampire Slayer by Al Katrina (Canada)
 Best Argentinian Fantasy Short: Después de Recién by Ignacio Laxalde and Bernardo Francese.

BARS 2006
INTERNATIONAL FEATURE SECTION
 Best Feature Film: Mondo Psycho (Argentina) by Mad Crampi.
 Best Feature Director: Marcus Widegren for Kraftverk 3714 (Sweden).
 Best Feature Screenplay: Ramiro and Adrián García Bogliano for 36 pasos (Argentina).
 Best Actor in a Feature Film: Emil Jonsson for Kraftverk 3714 (Sweden).
 Best Actress in a Feature Film: Mapi Romero for Belcebú (Spain).
 Audience Award: Song of the Dead (USA) by Chip Gubera.
 Best Special Effects: Martin Frías, Iru Landucci for 36 pasos (Argentina).
SHORT FILM SECTION
 Best Short Film: El cojonudo by Fede Álvarez (Uruguay)
 Best Short Film Director: Sacha Whitehouse for The City Eats its Weak (Australia)
 Audience Award for Best Short Film: El cojonudo by Fede Álvarez (Uruguay)
 Best Argentinian Fantasy Short: Asterión by Juan Carlos Camardella.
SPECIAL MENTION
 Special Mention of the Jury: cortometraje Griscelda (decromante) by Gabriel Grieco (Argentina)

BARS 2007
INTERNATIONAL FEATURE SECTION
 Best Film: On Evil Grounds (Auf Bösem Boden) (Austria)
 Best Director: Peter Koller for On Evil Grounds
 Best Screenplay: Demián Rugna for The Last Gateway (Argentina)
 Best Actress: Victoria Maurette for Left for Dead (USA/ Argentina)
NATIONAL FEATURE SECTION
 Best Film: Massacre Marcial IVX by Pablo Marini and Matias Lojo
SHORT FILM SECTION
 Best Short Film: Droomtijd (Dreamtime) by Tom Van Avermaet (Belgium)
 Best Director: Gabe Ibañez for Máquina (Spain)
 Best National Short: Naturaleza Muerta by Romina Caramagna
AUDIENCE AWARD
 Best Feature: Filmatrón by Pablo Parés.
 Best Short: Sucesión by Pablo Baltera

BARS 2008
INTERNATIONAL FEATURE SECTION
 Best Film: Tokyo Gore Police (Tôkyô zankoku keisatsu) by Yoshihiro Nishimura
 Audience Award: Mud Zombies (Mangue Negro) by Rodrigo Aragao
 Best Latin American Film: Nadie Inquietó Mas by Gustavo Leonel Mendoza
 Best Director: Bill Plympton for Idiots & Angels
 Best Screenplay: The Man from Earth
 Best FX: Yoshihiro Nishimura for Tokyo Gore Police
 Best Actor: Chris Sharp for Murder Party
 Best Actress: Josefina Sanz for Nocturnos
SPECIAL MENTION
 Producer: Paco Limón for Doctor Infierno
 Art Direction: Tokyo Gore Police
SHORT FILM SECTION
 Best Short Film: ELA in Love at First Byte by Fernando Sarmiento
 Audience Award: Maldito Sean 1º episodio by Demián Rugna
 Best National Short Film: Aquellos Ojos Brujos by Cesar Leonardo Delgado Brog
 Best Director: Alfons Casal, Hector Mas for El Comte Yácula
SPECIAL MENTION
 Best Comedy: División Bahia by Laura Casabé
 Best Animation: Piscis by Juan Camardella
 Best Production Design: The Container by Diego Melo.

BARS 2009
INTERNATIONAL FEATURE SECTION
 Best Film: Masacre esta noche
 Audience Award: Recortadas
 Audience Award for Latin American Film: Operación Cannabis
 Best Director Marc Price por Colin
 Best Screenplay: Demian Rugna por They want my eyes
 Best Actor: Diego Cremonese por Masacre esta noche
 Best Actress: Mariana Zanette por Morgue Story
 Best FX: Yesterday
MENTION
 Special Mention by the Jury "Revelación Femenina": Noelia Antunez and Mariana Levy for Recortadas
 Special Mention by the Jury "Revelación Masculina": Jorge Pinarelo for Masacre esta noche
 Special Mention by the Jury for Scream Queen: Natacha Mendez for Masacre esta noche
 Special Mention by the Jury for Post Production: Ataque de pánico!
 Special Mention by the Jury for Screenplay: La menace vient de l´espace
 Special Mention by the Jury for Adaptation: The Raven
SHORT FILM SECTION
 Best Short Film: Die Schneider Krankheit
 Best Argentinian Short: La extravagante and poco práctica venganza de la momia
 Best Short Film Director: María Luara Casabé for Sabrosura, Violín y Perico
 Audience Award Best Short Film: La villa seca
 Best Zombie Short: Evacuación

BARS 2010
INTERNATIONAL FEATURE SECTION
 Best Film: The Life and Death of a Porno Gang
 Audience Award Best Feature: Nunca mas asistas a este tipo de fiestas
 Best Director: Faye Jackson for Strigoi
 Best Actor: (ex aequo) Andrew Howard for Pig and Nicanor Loreti for Nunca mas asistas a este tipo de fiestas
 Best Actress: Roxana Guttman for Strigoi
 Best Screenplay: Mladen Djodjevic for The Life and Death of a Porno Gang
 Best Special Effects: Tomoo Haraguchi for Death Kappa
SPECIAL MENTION
 Special Mention by the Jury to MyM Matilde and Malena for "su busqueda formal, visual y narrativa"
 Special mention to Molina's Ferozz for the originality of una propuesta extrema
 Best Latin American Film (by popular vote): Trash
SHORT FILM SECTION
 Best Short Film: Cabine of the Dead
 Best Short Film Director: Sebastian Marka por Interview
 Best Argentinian Short Film: La vuelta del malón
SPECIAL MENTION
 Special Mention by the Jury to Copia A for its production and technical development
 Special Mention by the Jury to Working Day for his photography and esthetic language
 Special Mention by the Jury to Zombie Burguer Attack for the originality of your script
 Audience Award Short Film: Umiko.

BARS 2011
INTERNATIONAL FEATURE SECTION
 Best Film: Rabies
 Audience Award Best Feature Film: Plaga Zombie: Revolución Tóxica
 Best Director: Demian Rugna & Fabián Forte for Malditos Sean!
 Best Actor: Hernán Sáez for Plaga Zombie: Revolución Tóxica
 Best Actress: Ruth King for Zombie Undead
 Best Screenplay: Sean Branney & Andrew Leman for The Whisperer in Darkness
 Best Special Effects: The Theatre Bizarre
SIDE AWARDS
 Best Latin American Feature Film: Pólvora Negra by Kapel Furman
 Best Videofilm: El Turno Nocturno by Matías Rispau
 Special Mention by the Jury for Rabies to a group of actors and director, achieving a subtle and consistent performance
 Special Mention by the Jury to the Plaga Zombie (Zombie Plague) series by creative efforts over time to build a trilogy.
SHORT FILMS
 Best Short Film: Picnic by Gerardo Herrero.
 Best Director Short Film: Marc Herni Boulier for Tous les hommes s’appellent Robert
 Best Argentinian Short Film: Zombirama by Ariel Lopez V. and Mariano Benayon.
SPECIAL MENTION
 Special Mention by the Jury to Banana motherfucker, for most ambitious and psychedelic short.
 Special Mention by the Jury to ¡Toma mi mano!, for best short mostroneco and pichulín.
 Audience Award for short film: Making Off Sangriento.

BARS 2021 
INTERNATIONAL FEATURE SECTION

 Best Film: Fried Barry by Ryan Kruger.
 Audience Award Best Feature Film:  Sweetie, you won't believe it by Ernar Nurgaliev.
 Best Director: Cristian Ponce, for Historia de lo Oculto.
 Best Actor: Gary Green, for Fried Barry.
 Best Actress: Gaia Weiss, for Meander.
 Best Screenplay: Cristian Ponce, for Historia de lo Oculto.
 Best Special Effects: Rodrigo Aragão, for O cemitério das almas perdidas.

SIDE AWARDS
Best Latin American Feature Film: Leni, by Federico Gianotti.
SHORT FILMS
 Best Short Film: Killing small animals, by Marcus Svanberg.
 Best Director Short Film: Marcus Svanberg, for Killing small animals.
 Best Argentinian Short Film: Hay alguien en la puerta, by Santiago Fabrizio.
SPECIAL MENTION

 Special Mention by the Jury for best Short Film: Haute cuisine, by Merryl Roche.

 Special Mention by the Jury to Retrato Imaginario by Felipe Martinez Carbonell for best post-production (WANCAMP)

 Special Mention by the Jury to Retrato Imaginario by Felipe Martinez Carbonell for best script (Gui.Ar)
 Audience Award for short film: Under the Lather by Ollivier Briand.

References

Sources
 Variety.com news article
 Buenos Aires Rojo Sangre - official website
 Buenos Aires Rojo Sangre - Spanish Wikipedia article
 Buenos Aires Herald - news article
 Pagina 12 - news article
 Clarin - news article
 La Nacion - news article
 Filmfestivals.com - BARS videoblog
 Interview with Pable Sapere - festival director

Film festivals in Argentina
Fantasy and horror film festivals
Science fiction film festivals